The 2014 Clemson Tigers men's soccer team was the college's 54th season of playing organized men's college soccer, and their 27th season playing in the Atlantic Coast Conference.  The Tigers were led by fifth-year head coach Mike Noonan, and played their home games at Riggs Field.

Roster

Accessed June 13, 2017

Draft picks
The Tigers had two players drafted in the 2015 MLS SuperDraft.

Schedule

|-
!colspan=6 style=""| Exhibition

|-
!colspan=6 style=""| Regular season

|-
!colspan=6 style=""| ACC Tournament

|-
!colspan=6 style=""| NCAA Tournament

See also 

 Clemson Tigers men's soccer
 2014 Atlantic Coast Conference men's soccer season
 2014 NCAA Division I men's soccer season
 2014 ACC Men's Soccer Tournament
 2014 NCAA Division I Men's Soccer Championship

References 

Clemson Tigers
Clemson Tigers men's soccer seasons
Clemson Tigers
Clemson Tigers
2014